Ethan Zubak (born April 15, 1998) is an American professional soccer player who plays for Nashville SC in Major League Soccer.

Career
Zubak began his youth career with the Arsenal FC Academy in California before joining the LA Galaxy Academy in 2013.  Zubak was part of the Galaxy U16 Academy team that won a National Championship in 2014. On August 9, 2015, Zubak made his professional debut for LA Galaxy II in a 2–1 defeat to Arizona United SC. He scored his first professional goal on April 2, 2016 against the Real Monarchs. He scored his first National Team goal on September 5, 2016 at the Stevan Vilotic Tournament in Topola, Serbia against Hungary.

On August 22, 2020 Zubak scored his first MLS goal against LAFC.

On December 12, 2021 Zubak was traded to Nashville SC in exchange for a first-round pick in the 2022 MLS SuperDraft.

Career statistics

Club

Personal life
Zubak is a Christian. Zubak is married Katie Zubak.

References

External links
USSF Development Academy bio
Top Drawer Soccer bio
U19 US vs Hungary Match Report

1998 births
Living people
American soccer players
Association football forwards
LA Galaxy II players
LA Galaxy players
Nashville SC players
Soccer players from California
Sportspeople from Corona, California
USL Championship players
United States men's youth international soccer players
Major League Soccer players
Homegrown Players (MLS)